Cnemides or Knemides, also Cnemis or Knemis (Κνῆμις), is the name of a fortress, and probably of a town, in ancient Phocis. Strabo places Cnemides on Cape Cnemides opposite the islands called Lichades and the Euboean promontory Cenaeum, distant 20 stadia from Thronium and from Daphnus. The Periplus of Pseudo-Scylax, successively describing towns along the Phocian coast, places Cnemides after Thronium  and before Elateia and Panopeus.

The site of Cnemides is near the modern Gouvali.

References

Populated places in ancient Phocis
Populated places in Opuntian Locris
Former populated places in Greece